Sir Padampat Singhania University (SPSU) is a private, residential university located in Udaipur, India. The university was established by the J K Cement group of companies. The university is named after the founder of the J K Organisation.

The University came into existence through an Ordinance passed by the Government of Rajasthan in 2007 and which was subsequently made into the Sir Padampat Singhania University Act 2008. It was conceived as a boutique university that will not have more than a total of 1500 students but currently has around a total of 400 students enrolled.

SPSU, Udaipur has two constituent schools, namely the School of Engineering and the School of Management with both the schools offering Bachelors's, Masters and Doctoral programs.

History
In 2005, the JK Cement Nimbahera Foundation envisaged the creation of a university in Rajasthan.

Sir Padampat Singhania School of Engineering was established in 2007 when the first group of engineering students were admitted into the BTech programme. In 2007, the school was established as a recognized University, with the passing of the Sir Padampat Singhania University Ordinance 2007. This Ordinance was subsequently ratified as Sir Padampat Singhania University, Udaipur Act, 2008 (Act No. 4 of 2008) by the Legislative Assembly of the State of Rajasthan. SPSU is approved by UGC vide Notification No: F.9-8/2009(CPP-1) dated 13 April 2009 and is empowered to award degree as specified by the UGC under section 22 of the UGC Act, 1956".

Campus

The campus is recognisable by its distinctive white buildings, topped with yellow accents, reflecting the university's colours.

Organization
The University is governed by a privately appointed 19-member Board of Management. The board includes representatives from international universities, multinational organizations and JK Cement. The university has two schools - the School of Engineering and the School of Management.

Academics
Following are details of Academic programs offered by SPSU:

Admissions
Sir Padampat Singhania University admits students into its engineering and management programs via the SPSAT (Sir Padampat Singhania Admission Test).

Degrees
The university awards undergraduate and postgraduate degrees in engineering, and master's degrees in business administration.

Degrees awarded by the School of Engineering

 Bachelor of Technology (BTech) in the following streams of engineering:
 Biotechnology
 Computer Science and Engineering
 CSE - Internet of Things
 CSE - Cloud Technology and Information Security
 Civil Engineering
 Electrical Engineering
 Electronics and Communications Engineering
 Mechanical Engineering
 Railway Transportation Engineering
 Mining Engineering
 Doctor of Philosophy (PhD) in the following technical fields:
 Biotechnology
 Computer Science and Engineering
 Physics
 Mathematics
 Mechanical Engineering
The School of Engineering offers an International master's degree Programme. This is a five-year program conducted by SPSU and the Asian Institute of Technology (AIT), Thailand. Under this program, students spend first four years at SPSU and the fifth year at AIT. Upon successful completion of the program, students are awarded a master's degree in engineering.

Degrees awarded by the School of Management

 Master of Business Administration (MBA)
 Doctor of Philosophy (PhD) in the following specializations:
 Marketing
 Finance
 Human Resources
 Information Technology
 Digital Marketing & e-Commerce
 Bachelor in Hotel Management
 B.Com 
 BBA
 BBA - Financial Services

Academic collaborations
The university has established academic collaborations and partnerships with the following institutions:
 Asian Institute of Technology, Thailand
 Association of International Accountants, UK
 Chiba University of Commerce Japan
 University of Gothenburg, Sweden
 University of Nebraska at Omaha, USA
 Mendel University Czech Republic
SPSU conducts student and faculty exchanges, guest lectures and student enrichment programs with these institutions.

Corporate collaborations
The university has established partnerships with the following organizations to provide additional training and workshops for SPSU students and faculty:
 IBM
 Oracle
 Parametric Technology Corporation
 Sun Microsystems
 Cisco Networking Academy by CISCO Systems Inc.

Scholarships
SPSU awards full one-year tuition waiver scholarships to the best-performing undergraduate student of each academic year. Additionally, the top students from each branch of study are granted partial one-year tuition waiver scholarships.

SWAYAM NPTEL Local Chapter
The University has an active SWAYAM (Indian MOOC) NPTEL Local Chapter, which is managed by the SPOC of the University. Students are motivated for choice-based online learning along with University's syllabus.

Consultancy
The University is also involved in providing consultancy to the industry. All the departments have expert faculties which benefit the nearby industry by their knowledge.

Student life

Clubs and activities
Student-run clubs include:
 Cyborg: Technical 
 Electronics: Electronics club
 Concept: organizer's club which coordinates on-campus events and other activities.
 Arena: LAN gaming club.
 Atom: Table Tennis club.
 ASME: ASME, SPSU Student Section.
 Blast: Music club.
 Cluster: Volleyball club.
 Command: Programming club.
 EDC: Entrepreneurship Development Cell.
 Electronics: Electronics club
 Elements: Writers' club.
 Endurance: Competitive/ recruitment exams training club
 Energy: Football club.
 Grand Master: Chess club.
 Gyrate: Dance club.
 Hackerz: Computer security club. Coordinated by Mr. Prashant Rai.
 Magnitude: Theater club.
 Motion: Cricket club.
 Power: Kabaddi club.
 Snatchers: Basketball club.
 SAE India: Automotive and aerospace club; chapter of SAE International.
 Target: Badminton club.
 Track n Field: Track and field club.
Bracing Club:Kho kho club

The clubs are on paper in reality activities in these clubs is not existent.
The university also participates in the National Service Scheme (NSS) and maintains its own NSS cell.

Electronics club SPSU 
Electronics club was established on 24 August 2011 with aim to students feels electronics and they have proved it, their project was published in Times of India, Ahmedabad edition on 19 March 2012. 
Members of electronics club have visited Pyrotech Electronics pvt Ltd to get the experience of how an enterprise works.

Cyborg - The Technical Cell
Cyborg is a student-run and IIT Bombay collaborated Technical cell started in September 2011 to help students learn new technologies inside college campus and become industry ready. Cyborg has provided the following services to its student members:
 Linux workshops conducted by Aman Jain (erstwhile student at SPSU) and certified by IIT Bombay
 Robotics classes, regulated by EI Systems, Noida
 Training and mentorship by faculties regarding technical projects
 Other activities including Quiz, Website designing/hosting, Technical Extempore etc.

Concern - The Mentorship Cell
Concern is a student-run mentoring cell designed to help students adjust to college and derive maximum benefit from their time at SPSU. Since start Concern is provided with the following services:
 Admissions counseling for prospective students
 Mentoring and counseling services for admitted students
 Anti-ragging activities to maintain a ragging-free environment on campus
 Mess activities, including menu selection, off-hour snack services, etc.

Events

Panache
Panache is an annual event organized by SPSU students. It includes academic conferences and cultural events and is attended by academics, corporate leaders and university students from across the country.

TEDxSPSU
The university hosts its own TEDx events, which are organized by the student-run Entrepreneurship Development Cell. TEDxSPSU events were held in 2011 and 2012 with the themes Order from Chaos and The Times, they are changing respectively.

FPGA World 2011
The university hosted the 8th Field Programmable Gate Array (FPGA) World Conference in January 2011.

Diligent Design Content 2011
The university hosted the India chapter of the Diligent Design Contest in 2011.

DST Inspire
The university conducts "Inspire" the science camp for school students in collaboration with Department of Science & Technology (DST), Govt. of India.

References

External links
 Official website
 Panache

Technical universities and colleges in India
Private universities in India
Business schools in Rajasthan
Engineering colleges in Udaipur
Universities in Udaipur
Educational institutions established in 2008
2008 establishments in Rajasthan